Isabelle Rosabrunetto is a Monegasque diplomat. As of 2015, she serves as  Director General of the Ministry of Foreign Affairs and Cooperation of the Principality of Monaco. She is  Officer in the Order of Saint Charles (Monaco) and  Knight of the Order of National Merit (Mauritania).

Career
In 1999, Rosabrunetto started to serve as Deputy  Director of the Budget and Treasury Department of the Principality of Monaco and became Director in 2005.  As of April 2015, she has been appointed as  Director General of the Ministry of Foreign Affairs and Cooperation of the Principality of Monaco. During her service, she led Monegasque delegations to various foreign countries and multilateral organisations .

External links
 Isabelle Rosabrunetto on LinkedIn

Year of birth missing (living people)
Living people
Monegasque women diplomats